West Isle Air is an airline carrier based in Washington.

History
It was created in 2002. It also operates Chelan Seaplanes. The company generate $2.6 million in annual revenues, and employs 30 total employees across all locations.

Incidents/Crashes
2022 Mutiny Bay plane crash - 10 dead

References

Airlines established in 2002
American companies established in 2002
Companies based in Washington (state)
Airlines based in Washington (state)
1980 establishments in Washington (state)